Attack of The Planet Smashers is the second full-length release from The Planet Smashers. This is the first of three collaborations between the Planet Smashers and producer Chris Murray (the other two are Life of the Party and Unstoppable).

Track listing
 "Attack of The Planet Smashers"–2:39
 "The 80 Bus"–2:52
 "Hostile"–2:16
 "Change"–3:02
 "Repo Man"–3:19
 "Romeo"–2:31
 "Cooler Than You"–2:51
 "Get Out My Baby"–3:21
 "My Decision"–3:21
 "Uncle Gordie"–2:38
 "Dirty Old Man"–3:28
 "Take It From The Top"–3:19
 "She's So Hot"–3:25

References

1998 albums
The Planet Smashers albums